Amaravati is the capital of the Indian state of Andhra Pradesh. It is located on the banks of the river Krishna in Guntur district.

Dharanikota, the ancient city site nearby, was founded more than 2,200 years ago, serving as an ancient capital. The Amaravati Stupa was an important Buddhist site of pilgrimage and holy learning.  Under the British Raj, many ancient Buddhist sculptures were taken to other museums in India and Britain.

The Prime Minister of India, Narendra Modi laid the foundation stone at a ceremonial event in Uddandarayunipalem village on 22 October 2015.

The office of the Chief Minister of Andhra Pradesh has operated from Velagapudi since April 2016. The Andhra Pradesh Legislature remained in Hyderabad until March 2017, when it was relocated to newly constructed interim legislative buildings in Velagapudi.

Etymology 
The name "Amaravati" only dates back to the 18th century; the Amaravathi village, is near Dharanikota, the ancient capital of the Satavahana dynasty.  The metropolitan areas of Guntur, Vijayawada and Tenali are the major conurbations of Amaravati.  Amaravati translates literally as 'the place for immortals'.

History 

Dharanikota (Dhānyakatakam) near Amaravati was an important city in the cultural heritage and history of Andhra Pradesh. Its history dates back to 2nd Century BCE when it was the capital of the Satavahana Dynasty of the (Andhras), one of the earliest Indian empires and the ancestral dynasty of Andhra Pradesh. The Satavahanas are prominent in the history of Andhra Pradesh. Their main language was Prakrit written using Brahmi Script, which served as the base for the script of Telugu Language. They issued many coins with this Prakrit language which can be found in many inscriptions in this region today. The practice of Buddhism was predominant during this period and the dynasty was partly responsible for the prevalence of Buddhism in the region.

The city was also once a holy site of Mahayana Buddhism. The city used to have a large Buddhist Stupa now known as Amaravati Stupa but then called a Mahachaitya, which was ruined over time. It was also the centre of Buddhist learning and art where many buddhist followers from many South East Asian countries used to visit. It can be seen from the Amaravati Stupa, many Buddhist inscriptions, sculptures and Gautam Buddha Statue in the city. Many other ancient Amaravati sculptures and Buddhist relics from the region were unfortunately destroyed over the time and the largest group was removed to the Government Museum, Chennai and others to the British Museum during British rule, which can be seen there today. The sculptures from Amaravati depict many scenes from Buddhist art, inscriptions and Buddhist stupas. The city along with Nagarjuna Konda is viewed as one of the richest holy sites of Buddhism in the whole of India.  

The present capital area has its historical significance of having recorded its first-ever legislation 2,200 years ago. The present-day capital region includes the Amaravati village. The area has been ruled by the Mauryas, Satavahanas, Ikshvakus, Vishnukundina, Pallavas, Cholas, Kakatiyas, Delhi Sultanate, Musunuri Nayaks, Bahmani Sultanate, Vijayanagara Empire, Sultanate of Golconda and Mughal Empire successively before the founding of the Nizam of Hyderabad in 1724. It was ceded to France in 1750 but was captured by the East India Company in 1759. Guntur returned to the Nizamate in 1768 but was ceded to Britain again in 1788. It was briefly occupied by Hyder Ali. It was then ruled by Vasireddy Venkatadri Nayudu, who founded the modern Amaravathi village, using building materials from the stupa, which he largely demolished. It was part of the Madras Presidency during the British colonial period.

As per the Andhra Pradesh Reorganisation Act, 2014, Hyderabad became the capital of the then newly formed state of Telangana, post bifurcation of Andhra Pradesh. However, Hyderabad would remain as the joint capital of both states for a period not exceeding ten years. Hence, Amaravati is being built to serve as the capital of Andhra Pradesh.

The foundation for the city was laid at Uddandarayunipalem on 22 October 2015. The Prime Minister of India, Narendra Modi;  the  Chief Minister of Andhra Pradesh, N. Chandrababu Naidu; the Vice President of India and the Chairman of the Rajya Sabha Muppavarapu Venkaiah Naidu; then Governor E. S. L. Narasimhan; the Japanese minister for economy trade and industry, Yosuke Takagi; and the Singaporean Minister for Trade and Industry, S. Iswaran, laid the foundation for the city.

In August 2020, Andhra Pradesh Legislative Assembly passed Andhra Pradesh Decentralisation and Inclusive Development of All Regions Act, 2020. According to its provisions, Visakhapatnam is the executive capital while Amaravati and Kurnool serve as legislative and judicial capitals, respectively. The decision resulted in widespread protests by the farmers of Amaravati. The act has been challenged in Andhra Pradesh High Court, which ordered to maintain status quo until the court completes its hearing. On 22 November 2021, the government, led by Y. S. Jagan Mohan Reddy, have withdrawn the act.

Geography 

The city is being built in Guntur district and Palnadu district, on the banks of the Krishna River.

Vision 

The 13th Chief Minister of Andhra Pradesh N. Chandrababu Naidu envisioned Amaravati to be the people-centric pioneer Smart City of India, built around sustainability and livability principles, and to be the happiest city in the world. Among the innovative features on the drawing board are navigation canals around the city, and connecting to an island in the Krishna River.

The city is being designed to have 51% green space and 10% of water bodies, with a plan to house some of the most iconic buildings there. It is being modeled on Singapore, with the master plan being prepared by two Singapore government-appointed consultants. Other international consultants and architects will then be brought in to give the city an international flavor.

City planning 

The Andhra Pradesh State Cabinet meeting passed a resolution of 1 September 2014 to locate the Capital City in a central place of the state, around Vijayawada, and to go for decentralized development of the state with 3 Mega Cities and 14 Smart Cities. The State Government identified the Capital City area between Vijayawada and Guntur cities on the Southern bank of River Krishna upstream of Prakasam Barrage. The Amaravati Capital City has an area of 217.23 km2 and is spread across 25 villages in 3 mandals (Thullur, Mangalagiri and Tadepalli) of Guntur district. The 25 villages in the Capital City area have about 1 lakh population in about 27,000 households. The nearest cities are Vijayawada at a distance of 30 km and Guntur at a distance of 18 km. The nearest railway station is KC Canal railway station near Tadepalli and the nearest airport is Gannavaram which is at a distance of 22 km. The city is planned to spread over 217 km2 area with a total cost of ₹ 553.43 billions to the Capital Region Development Authority (CRDA) out of which state government contribution is only ₹ 126 billion (equity ₹ 66.29 billion and supporting grant ₹ 59.71 billion) spread over a period of 8 years from April 2018 to March 2026 (₹ 5 billion in 2018–19, ₹ 18 billion per year for later six years and ₹ 13 billion in 2025–26).

The contribution from the government is to be repaid by the CRDA after 2037. Ultimately state or union governments are not incurring any expenditure to construct the city but wholly financed by the income accrued from the sale of land for various development schemes (₹ 171.51 billion), loans and the local taxes (₹ 146.41 billion by 2037) to the CRDA. The state and union governments are expected to earn ₹ 120 billion per annum out of which state goods and services tax (State GST) alone is ₹ 60 billion per annum. The entire city construction is planned by self-financing from loans and land selling with the state government's moral support. CRDA is expecting a net surplus income of ₹ 333 billion by 2037 after meeting the total expenditure on the city. Amaravati government complex which is intended to provide world-class facilities needed for the state government and its employees' accommodation is also part of the CRDA project. The bus rapid transit system (BRTS) in Amaravati to connect with the adjacent Vijayawada and Guntur cities by world-class road network is also part of the CRDA project. Both Amaravati government complex and BRTS are planned with an expenditure of ₹ 140 billion.

Timeline

Status 

In 2019, the new state government allocated a budget of only ₹500 crore and immediately stopped all running projects in the middle of construction that was started by the previous Naidu government. The Amaravati project has substantially slowed with no deadline in sight.

As of 2020, the fate of Amaravati as the sole capital of Andhra Pradesh hangs in balance as the incumbent YSRCP Government has proposed to move the Executive and Judicial components of the capital to Visakhapatnam and Kurnool respectively. There has been a continuing backlash from the farmers of the region against this decision of the Government for the past 644 days. The agitators are still awaiting the Chief Minister's appointment for a plausible solution.

Government and politics

Administration 
Amaravati is an Urban Notified Area and its urban development and planning activities are undertaken by the Amaravati Development Corporation Limited and Andhra Pradesh Capital Region Development Authority (APCRDA). The Andhra Pradesh Secretariat at Velagapudi is the administrative block for the employees of the state government.

The APCRDA has its jurisdiction over the city and is the conurbation covering Andhra Pradesh Capital Region.

The table below lists the identified villages and hamlets under their respective mandals, which became a part of the capital city.

Notes:
 M – municipality
 The names in brackets are the hamlet villages of the respective settlement.

Language and religion 
The residents of Amaravati are mainly Telugu-speaking people along with some Urdu and other minorities. Telugu is the official language of the city. Hindus form a very large majority, but there are also Muslim, Christian, and Buddhist communities. Religious sites include the Amaralingeswara Swamy Temple, and the Amaravati stupa in the Amaravati heritage complex.

Economy and infrastructure 
The state government originally initiated the Singapore-based Ascendas-Singbridge and Sembcorp Development consortium for the city's construction. The city's infrastructure was to be developed in 7–8 years in phases, at an estimated cost of ₹33,000 crore. ₹7,500 crore from the Housing and Urban Development Corporation (HUDCO), $500 million from the World Bank and ₹2,500 crore from the Indian Government, of which ₹1,500 crore has been granted.

As of July 2019, the World Bank dropped funding for Amaravati. As of September 2019, the Ascendas-Singbridge and Sembcorp Development consortium have also withdrawn from the project. With only state government allocated budget of ₹500 crore in 2019, the Amravati project has substantially slowed, with no deadline in sight.

Nine themed cities consisting of Finance, Justice, Health, Sports, Media, and Electronics; including Government buildings designed by Norman Foster, Hafeez Contractor, Reliance Group, and NRDC-India will be built within the city. HCL Technologies, an IT firm would set up one of its centres in Amaravati.

BRS Medicity with an investment of $1.8 billion is to come to Amaravati.
Mangalagiri Sarees and Fabrics produced in Mangalagiri mandal, a part of the state capital, were registered as one of the geographical indications from Andhra Pradesh.

Education 

Colleges and universities

There are public funded universities within the city limits:

 Acharya Nagarjuna University                                           
 Guntur Medical College
 Acharya N. G. Ranga Agricultural University
 Krishna University
 Dr. NTR University of Health Sciences
 National Institute of Design
 Rajiv Gandhi University of Knowledge Technologies, Nuzvid  
 All India Institute of Medical Sciences, Mangalagiri

Private and autonomous colleges in the city include:

 KL University
 Vignan's Foundation for Science, Technology & Research
 Andhra Loyola College                                                                                                                              
 SRM University, Andhra Pradesh
 Vellore Institute of Technology
 Siddhartha Medical College
 Gudlavalleru Engineering College
 NRI Academy of Medical Sciences
 Andhra Christian College
 Vasireddy Venkatadri Institute of Technology
 Katuri Medical College

Private institutes like Amrita University, Amity University and the Indo-UK Institute of Health (IUIH) in collaboration with the King's College London, are among others to set up campus in Amaravati. In 2018 the city's first management institute, Xavier School of Management, was under construction near Ainavolu.

Tourism 

Located on the banks of the Krishna River and between natural getaways and places of heritage, the city has several tourist attractions:

 Dhyana Buddha statue 
 Amaravati Stupa 
 Archaeological Museum, Amaravati 
 Amaralingeswara Temple
 Undavalli Caves 
 Bhavani Island 
 Kondapalli Fort 
 Kanaka Durga Temple 
 Prakasam Barrage 
 Kondaveedu Fort

Transport 

The buses operated by Andhra Pradesh State Road Transport Corporation (APSRTC) from Pandit Nehru Bus Station and NTR bus station, Tenali bus station connects the city with Vijayawada and Tenali, Guntur respectively.

The government, however, is to explore other means of mass transport like ‘monorail’, Bus Rapid Transit System (BRTS) and tramways. Two new depots, North and South of the APSRTC are proposed to be constructed. Auto rickshaws also operate for shorter distances in the capital city area.

Air 
Vijayawada International Airport serves the whole Andhra Pradesh Capital Region.

Roadways 

The Amaravati–Anantapur Expressway, supported by Kurnool and Kadapa Feeder Roads is an ongoing greenfield expressway project, which would provide faster road access from the districts of Anantapur, Guntur, Kadapa, Kurnool and Prakasam to Amaravati, Rajamahendravaram, Kakinada, and Visakhapatnam.  The Amaravati seed capital road is an arterial road under construction to access the core capital area from National Highway 16. The Vijayawada-Amaravati road connects the city with Vijayawada.

Railways 

Sports

ACA International Cricket Stadium 

ACA International Cricket Stadium (also known as the Andhra Cricket Association International Cricket Stadium) is a stadium under construction at Mangalagiri in Amaravati. It is situated in Guntur district and will be spread over 24 acres. The stadium will be owned by Andhra Cricket Association and has a seating capacity of 40,000.

Amaravati International Sports Complex 
It consists of two swimming pools of 50×20 metres and 20×20 metres, an outdoor synthetic track, a multipurpose indoor hall, and a Ground+2 clubhouse. This complex will be the new headquarters for the Sports Authority of Andhra Pradesh (SAAP).

Events

F1H2O Grand Prix of India
From 16 to 18 November in 2018, Amaravati hosted the second (after Mumbai in 2004) F1H2O World championship Grand Prix ever held in India. The event brought wide media attention especially after one of the teams took the color and the name of the state, making it the first Indian branded team in the history of F1H2O. Team Amaravati led by drivers Jonas Andrson and Eric Edin.

First National Women's Parliament in Amaravati 

Buddhist spiritual leader the Dalai Lama participated in the First National Women's Parliament in Amaravati on 10 February 2017. He said, "Making Amaravati, the capital of new Andhra Pradesh is a welcome move and I wish it develops well on all fronts. This heritage city has undergone a lot of change over the years... The economy would flourish where there is peace".

Happy Cities Summit 

The Happy Cities Summit Amaravati 2019 backed by APCRDA aims to build on the success and momentum of the inaugural summit to establish Amaravati at the forefront of the discourse on urban innovation with a focus on citizen happiness. Discussion of the Happy Homes project was underway after Y. S. Jagan Mohan Reddy was elected Chief Minister of Andhra Pradesh. The Government of Andhra Pradesh has also successfully hosted the inaugural Happy Cities Summit in Amaravati in April 2018. The summit saw the participation of 1,500+ delegates from 15+ countries, including eminent city leaders and urban experts.

See also 
 Andhra Pradesh Capital Region
 List of neighbourhoods in Amaravati

Notes

References

External links 

 Current affairs in Telugu
 The master plan of the proposed capital region, including a map

 
Indian capital cities
Planned cities in India
2015 establishments in Andhra Pradesh
Palnadu district
Cities in Andhra Pradesh
Cities in Andhra Pradesh Capital Region